Lavandulyl acetate is the acetate ester of lavandulol. It is a component of lavender oil.

References 

Monoterpenes
Acetate esters